This article lists the Co-operative Party's election results in UK parliamentary elections.

Summary of general election performance

Election results

By-elections, 1910-1918

1918 general election

By-elections, 1918-1922

Jones stood as a joint Co-operative - Labour Party candidate.

1922 general election

1923 general election

1924 general election

1929 general election

Candidates stood jointly with the  Labour Party.

By-election, 1929-1931

Candidates stood jointly with the  Labour Party.

1931 general election

Candidates stood jointly with the  Labour Party.

By-elections, 1931-1935

Candidates stood jointly with the Labour Party.

1935 general election

Candidates stood jointly with the  Labour Party.

1945 general election

Candidates stood jointly with the  Labour Party.

By-election, 1945-1950

1950 general election

Candidates stood jointly with the  Labour Party.

By-elections, 1950-1951

1951 general election

By-elections, 1951-1955

1955 general election

By-elections 1955-1959

1959 general election

By-elections, 1959-1964

1964 general election

1966 general election

1970 general election

February 1974 general election

October 1974 general election

By-elections, 1974-1979

1979 general election

By-elections, 1979-1983

1983 general election

1987 general election

By-elections, 1987-1992

1992 general election

By-elections, 1992-1997

1997 general election

By-elections, 1997-2001

2001 general election

2005 general election

2010 general election

2015 general election

By-elections, 2015-2017

2017 general election

2019 general election

References

Co-operative Party
Election results by party in the United Kingdom